Francis Willoughby, 2nd Baron Middleton (4 October 1692 – 31 July 1758), was a British politician who sat in the House of Commons from 1713 to 1727. He succeeded to a barony in the Peerage of Great Britain.

He was born the eldest son of Thomas Willoughby, 1st Baron Middleton, and Elizabeth, the daughter and coheiress of Sir Richard Rothwell, 1st Bt. He was the brother of Hon. Thomas Willoughby, MP.

He was educated at Eton and at Jesus College, Cambridge, graduating MA in 1712.

He was returned as Member of Parliament for Nottinghamshire at the general elections of 1713 and 1715. At the 1722 general election he was returned as MP for Tamworth until 1727.

He succeeded to the barony on his father's death in 1729, and inherited estates at Wollaton Hall, Nottinghamshire (where he lived), and at Middleton Hall, Middleton, Warwickshire.

He was High Steward of the Royal Town of Sutton Coldfield from 1729.

He married Mary Edwards in 1723 by whom he had two sons, who succeeded in turn to the barony, and a daughter:
Francis Willoughby, 3rd Baron Middleton (1726–1774)
Thomas Willoughby, 4th Baron Middleton (1728–1781)
daughter, name unknown

References

1692 births
1758 deaths
People educated at Eton College
Alumni of Jesus College, Cambridge
Willoughby, Francis
British MPs 1713–1715
British MPs 1715–1722
British MPs 1722–1727
Francis 2